Köthen is a railway station located in Köthen, Germany. The station is located on the Magdeburg-Leipzig railway, Dessau–Köthen railway and Köthen–Aschersleben railway. The train services are operated by Deutsche Bahn. The train services on the Köthen–Aken railway finished in December 2007, due to too few passengers.

Train services
The following services currently call at the station:

Intercity Express services (ICE 50) Köln - Wuppertal - Dortmund - Hamm - Hannover - Braunschweig - Magdeburg - Halle - Leipzig - Dresden
Intercity services (IC 55) Köln - Wuppertal - Dortmund - Hamm - Hannover - Braunschweig - Magdeburg - Halle - Leipzig - Dresden
Intercity services (IC 56) Warnemünde – Rostock – Magdeburg – Halle – Leipzig
Intercity services (IC 56) Norddeich - Emden - Oldenburg - Bremen - Hannover - Braunschweig - Magdeburg - Halle - Leipzig
Regional services  Magdeburg - Köthen - Halle
Local services  Aschersleben - Köthen - Dessau

External links

References

Railway stations in Saxony-Anhalt
railway station
Buildings and structures in Anhalt-Bitterfeld
Railway stations in Germany opened in 1840